Sun Dafa (November 1945 – 26 September 2019) was a general of the Chinese People's Liberation Army (PLA) who served as Political Commissar of the PLA General Logistics Department.

Biography 
Sun was born in November 1945 in Jinzhai, Anhui, Republic of China. He enlisted in the People's Liberation Army in 1964 and joined the Chinese Communist Party in 1968.

After 1977, he served as the secretary of Li Desheng, then the commander of the Shenyang Military Region. In May 1984, he was appointed Political Commissar of the 115th Division of the 39th Group Army. In June 1990, he was promoted to Director of the Political Department of the 16th Group Army, and attained the rank of major general. He was later promoted to political commissar of the 16th Army.

In January 1999, Sun became Director of the Political Department of the Shenyang Military Region, and attained the rank of lieutenant general in 2000. He was transferred to the Nanjing Military Region in August 2003 and became Director of the Political Department there. In January 2005, he became vice political commissar and secretary of discipline commission of the Nanjing Military Region. From 2005, he served as Political Commissar of the PLA General Logistics Department. He was made a full general in June 2007.

Sun was a member of the 17th Central Committee of the Communist Party of China. He graduated from PLA National Defense University and has authored some military books, for example High-Tech War Strategy.

Sun died in Beijing on 26 September 2019, aged 73.

References

1945 births
2019 deaths
People's Liberation Army generals from Anhui
People from Jinzhai County
Chinese military writers
People's Republic of China writers
Writers from Anhui
Members of the 17th Central Committee of the Chinese Communist Party